The Order of British India was an order of merit established in 1837 by the East India Company for "long, faithful and honourable service". The company's powers were removed after the Indian Mutiny, and the Order was incorporated into the British Honours System in 1859. The order became obsolete in 1947, after the partition of British India into the Dominion of India and the Dominion of Pakistan.

The Order
The Order of British India was awarded by the Viceroy of India for long, faithful and honourable service by Viceroy's Commissioned (i.e. native Indian) Officers in the Indian Army. While the Order could be awarded for distinguished service on a particular campaign, it was more often awarded to selected serving officers of between 20 and 30 years service.

Establishment

When first ordered by Lord William Bentinck in April 1837, the Order was intended as a means of providing recognition for serving Indian officers in the East India Company's military forces. These so-called "Native Officers" faced slow promotion under a system that was based on advancement through seniority. The 1st Class of the Order conferred the title of sirdar bahadoor on the 100 subedars and risaldars (senior Indian officer ranks) to whom membership was limited, plus an increase in salary of two rupees a day. Appointments to the 2nd Class, limited to a further 100 Indian officers of any rank, entitled the recipient to the title of bahadoor and a more modest wage increase. In an article published in the Calcutta Review in 1856 Henry Lawrence however expressed the opinion that the Order had become "virtually the reward of old age" with its wearers mostly limited to retired pensioners.

Later history

In September 1939 eligibility was extended to include native officers serving in the Indian States Forces, Frontier Corps and Military Police, and further extended in January 1944 to include native officers and Indian Warrant Officers in the Royal Indian Navy and the Hong Kong and Singapore Royal Artillery, as well as foreign officers, who could be appointed honorary members of the Order.

Appearance

The Order was awarded in two classes, both worn from a neck ribbon:First Class. The badge consisted of a gold star  in diameter composed of rays of gold with in the centre the words ORDER OF BRITISH INDIA encircling a lion on a background of light blue enamel, surrounded by a laurel wreath, surmounted by a Crown. The enamel behind the wording was dark blue until 1939, when it was changed to the same light blue as appears behind the lion. Recipients of the first class were entitled to use the title Sardar Bahadur (heroic leader).
Second class. The badge comprised a slightly smaller gold star  in diameter of similar design to the first class, but without the crown and with the centre enamel in dark blue enamel. Recipients of the second class were entitled to the title Bahadur (hero).

Holders of both classes could use the post-nominal letters OBI.

All initial awards to the Order were in the second class, with appointments to the first class made from existing members of the second class.

The ribbon was originally sky-blue, but changed to dark red in 1838 after it was found that the hair oil favoured by Indian soldiers stained the ribbon. From September 1939 the first class ribbon had two thin light blue strips added towards the centre of the dark red ribbon, while the second class had one light blue stripe added to the centre of the ribbon.

Pakistan awarded the Order to a small number of seconded British officers who rendered outstanding services at the time of independence.

Recipients
The following is an incomplete list of people appointed to the Order of British India:

First Class
 Sardar Bahadur Major General Bakhshish Singh OBI 1st Class 14 June 1912 (Military Secretary Patiala).
 Sardar Bahadur Captain Gardhara Singh Minhas OBI, was awarded the OBI(First Class) for his contribution in the Great Wars and long meritorious service. 

Sardar Bahadur Colonel Thakur Bahadur Singh Bagawas OBI awarded for contribution in the battle of Haifa during the world war 1 and long meritorious service. https://m.timesofindia.com/city/jaipur/remembering-kana-general-hero-of-the-1918-haifa-battle/amp_articleshow/77208542.cms
 Honorary Captain Muhammad Khan, OBI (1st Class), 10th Baluch Regiment.

 Subedar Major Bahadur Multani Ram, OBI (First Class) 1920, IDSM, Faizabad Cantonment (Royal Army), WW1 participant.
 Sardar Bahadur Unjur Tiwari, 1st Bengal Native Infantry. Spied for British forces during the Indian Mutiny.
Colonel Rao Bahadur Thakur Balu Singh ji Inderpura, OBI, IDSM (1st Class) 
Nawab Mir Hashim Ali Khan, Col Hahsim Nawaz Jung, OBI SB, (1st Class 1897).
 Sardar Bahadur Lieutenant Raja Paindah Khan O.B.I Chieftain of Mohrah Rajgan Jhelum, 1/14 Punjab  Regiment.
Sardar Bahadur Captain Moovera kalappa, OBI, 71st Coorg Rifles, WW2 Burma Campaign. 
 Sardar Bahadur Raja Jeoraj Singh, of Sandwa, CBE, OBI, Major-General in the Bikaner State Forces, Member, Executive Council, Bikaner State, Rajputana.
 Sardar Bahadur Captain Raja Feroz Khan Chieftain of Gorha Rajgan Jhelum, O.B.I, Frontier Force Rifles.

 Khan Bahadur General Fateh Naseeb Khan OBI 1st Class 17 January 1929 (Alwar State Forces).

 Honorary Captain Sardar Bahadur Bhola Singh Gulia, OBI (1st Class), Indian Survey Regiment of Badli, Haryana, India.
 Subadar Major and Honorary Captain Sardar Bahadur Ghafur Khan OBI, IDSM late 4/15th Punjab Regiment.
 Subedar Major and Honorary Lieutenant Sardar Bahadur Pehlwan Khan MBE, OBI, Bronze Star Medal.
 Sardar Bahadur Tiku Singh Thapa, OBI, KPM, CM, 2nd in Command, Gurkha Military Police.
 'Sardar Bahaudur' Honorary Captain Bakhshi Jagat Singh, OBI(1st class); enlisted in 5th Bengal Cavalry in 1857, participated in the 'Bhutan War' then served as a spy in Afghanistan providing valuable maps and sketches of routes; retired from the 16th Bengal Cavalry.
 Honorary Captain Taj Mohammad Khan OBI, IDSM, Poona Horse

Second class
 
 Risaldar Nadir Ali Khan, Bamba Rajput, 9th Hodson's Horse. 
 Subedar and Honorary Captain Bahadur Inayat Ullah Asmie, OBI (2nd Class), 10 Baluch Regiment.
 Subedar-Major Bahadur Jagindar Singh, OBI (2nd Class), IOM (2nd Class).
 Subedar Major Purushottam Dass "Bahadur" OBI (2nd Class) of 74th Punjabis, (Village Heb, Thural Kangra District (Then Jullundar District). awarded the Order of British India on 16 April 1911.
 Subedar Major and Honorary Lieutenant Ram Singh Kaila, Bahadur, IOM, OBI, of 15th Ludhiana Sikhs (1887–1916), 82nd Punjabis (1916–21). IOM for gallantry at Chagra Kotal (Tirah, NWFP, Pakistan).
 Commandant Sardar Bahadur Narain Singh Hundal, OBI 2nd Class, Kapurthala State Forces.
 Risaldar Mir Dad Khan Tarin of 9th Hodson Horse. 
Subedar (Hony Subedar-Major) Amar Nath Puri, Bahadur, OBI, of Indian Medical Department, posted in I.M.H Bakloh in 1942 .
Risaldar Major Ganga Dat Honorary Lieutenant 2nd lancer OBI 1917 France

Notes

References
 Peter Duckers, British Orders And Decorations, Shire Publications, Buckinghamshire, 2004

"Indian Army List- July 1942. https://archive.org/details/in.ernet.dli.2015.285000/page/n1460/mode/1up?view=theater

Orders, decorations, and medals of British India
Civil awards and decorations of the United Kingdom
Military awards and decorations of the United Kingdom
Orders, decorations, and medals of the British Empire
Orders, decorations, and medals of India
Medals of the Honourable East India Company
Awards established in 1837